Eco Wiebe Bijker (Utrecht, June 29, 1924 – Bilthoven, February 22, 2012) was a Dutch civil engineer. He was professor of coastal engineering at Delft University of Technology from 1968 until his retirement in 1989.

Career
Bijker completed studies in civil engineering at the Polytechnical School Utrecht in 1944 and at the TU Delft (with honours) in 1949. After his studies in Delft, he joined the then Waterloopkundig Laboratorium (Delft Hydraulics, nowadays Deltares), where he mainly worked in the lab "De Voorst" in the Dutch Noordoostpolder. There he successively became head of department, head of the De Voorst Laboratory and deputy director. He acquired world fame with his contributions to coastal hydraulic engineering. He conducted important research into the scaling rules for coastal models and developed his formula for wave-driven longitudinal transport along sandy coasts

This work eventually led to his PhD. He obtained his PhD in Technical Sciences for his dissertation Some considerations about scales for coastal models with movable bed with prof.ir. H.J. Schoemaker.

As early as 1957, Bijker became involved in education as a teacher at the then International Course (now UNESCO-IHE). He fulfilled this task for 40 years and thus contributed significantly to establishing the name of the Netherlands as a leading player in (coastal) hydraulic engineering. Through his international students, his approach, which was always based on a combination of theory and practice, was accepted and propagated all over the world. His involvement in education was greatly intensified after his appointment as professor of coastal engineering at TU Delft. He accepted this professorate with the inaugural address Varen is noodzakelijk, leven...? in 1969. Here too, he emerged as a passionate and inspiring teacher who has contributed significantly to the formation of generations of Dutch coastal hydraulic engineers for more than twenty years. He retired with his valedictory address in 1989 on The coast in a PC.

In addition to his work at TU Delft, Bijker was also closely involved in the work of the Technical Advisory Committee for Flood Defences, the CUR  and the Subsidence Committee. Shortly before his retirement, Bijker organized the International Conference of Coastal Engineering in Delft in 1990. Bijker has been awarded several times, including the International Coastal Engineering Award from the ASCE and the Knight in the Danebrog Order (Denmark) award.

International
Bijker has always been strongly committed internationally. He was internationally active within the ICCE (Int. Conference on Coastal Engineering). But when the ASCE decided to host the ICCE in South Africa in 1982 (during the height of apartheid), it was one of the driving forces behind the boycott of this conference. As an alternative, the Copedec (Conference on Coastal and Port Engineering in Developing Countries) was established under the leadership (and financing) of the Netherlands, Denmark, Germany and Great Britain, with a secretariat in Colombo, Sri Lanka. Currently, this conference is still organized every four years, now under the auspices of the PIANC. Although this caused friction with a number of Americans in 1982, he won the International Coastal Engineering Award from the ASCE in 1986. As already mentioned, he started teaching at Unesco-IHE early in his career, and continued to do so long after his retirement (until 2000).

References

Some of his publications
The institutional repository of TU Delft gives an overview of some of he publications by Bijker.

Other references

Delft University of Technology alumni
Dutch engineers
People from Delft
1924 births
2012 deaths